Ankita Shorey is an Indian model and actress who was crowned as the Femina Miss India Winner. She appeared in a Canadian documentary The World Before Her, presented by Anurag Kashyap and written and directed by Nisha Pahuja.

Early life 
Shorey is the daughter of brigadier Arun Shorey, who serves in the army, and Neelam Shorey, an army school principal.

From the ages of five to twelve, she spent time in a Buddhist monastery in Ladakh, India. Shorey trained as a theatre actress in New Delhi, under NSD theatre's director, Rashid Ansari.

Shorey was a Delhi University topper in History Honours.

Career 
Shorey won the Femina Miss India International pageant in 2011. 

She was the first Miss India and model to be a spokesperson for a jewelry brand Gitanjali Jewelry. Shorey also represents Ticino watches and Rare Heritage, a bridal store.

Modelling
Shorey walked the ramp at Manish Malhotra's fashion show Mijwan Sonnets in Fabric in 2012 as Showopener. She was a catwalk showstopper at India International Jewellery Week 2012 with Bipasha Basu.

In 2013, Shorey was a showstopper for Rocky S at Lakme Fashion Week, and Showstopper for Anju Modi at Wills Lifestyle India Fashion Week 2013. At IIJW 2013, she was also a showstopper on the first show of the first day for Gitanjali Jewelry with Akshay Kumar and Sonakshi Sinha.

Shorey was a Brand Ambassador at Aamby Valley India Bridal Fashion Week 2012 for JJ Valaya and Tarun Tahiliani.

In 2016, Shorey walked as a Showstopper for Narendra Kumar at French European Indian Fashion Week at Eiffel Tower in Paris.

Hosting
Shorey hosted the Filmfare award in 2012 with Ranbir Kapoor and Shahrukh Khan.

Movies
Shorey signed up for a three-film deal with Bhushan Kumar and T-Series in 2013; all three films will be of different genres. She played herself in the 2012 film The World Before Her, written and directed by Nisha Pahuja.

Endorsement
Shorey was a brand ambassador for Gitanjali Jewellery and the India Bridal Fashion Week in 2012, as well as the jewellery brand Gili in 2014.

Personal life 
Shorey is a practicing Buddhist. She has a brother, Aman Shorey, also known as 'Bro Aman'. Her brother shaved his head in 2011 because he had "promised to God" that he would do so if Ankita won the pageant, which she did.

References

External links

 
Ankita Shorey on Instagram

Female models from Jammu and Kashmir
Indian beauty pageant winners
Actresses from Jammu and Kashmir
Living people
Miss International 2011 delegates
Delhi University alumni
Year of birth missing (living people)